Jean-Mermoz International School is a French international school in Cocody, Abidjan, Ivory Coast. It serves maternelle (preschool) through lycée (senior high school).

The school was established on the site of the former Collège international Jean-Mermoz, which opened in 1961 and closed in November 2004. The new school reopened in 2014 with the French name lycée to show that high school is a part of the institution.

See also
 Lycée Français Blaise Pascal Abidjan
 List of schools in Abidjan

References

External links
  Jean-Mermoz International School
 English information

French international schools in Ivory Coast
Schools in Abidjan
Educational institutions established in 1961
1961 establishments in Ivory Coast
Educational institutions disestablished in 2004
Educational institutions established in 2014
2014 establishments in Ivory Coast
Elementary and primary schools in Ivory Coast
High schools and secondary schools in Ivory Coast
International high schools